

20th century 
 1905–1911 Constitutional Revolution
 1914–1921 Jungle Rebellion
 1919–1922 Simko Shikak revolt
 1921 coup d'état
 1921 Azerbaijan Crisis
 1924 Sheikh Khazal rebellion
 1926 Shikak revolt
 1939–1945 Anglo-Soviet invasion
 1953 coup d'état
 1963 Uprising
 1967 Kurdish revolt
 1979 Revolution
 Kurdish separatism
 1979 Kurdish rebellion
 1989–1996 KDPI insurgency
 Arab separatism in Khuzestan
 1979 Khuzestan rebellion
 1982 Amol uprising
 1999 student protests

21st century 
 Kurdish separatism
 2004— ongoing PJAK insurgency 
 2004— ongoing Sistan and Baluchestan insurgency
 2009 presidential election protests
 2011–2012 protests

See also 
 List of wars involving Iran

Politics of Iran
Conflicts